SKF-81,297 is a synthetic drug of the benzazepine chemical class that acts as a selective dopamine D1/D5 receptor full agonist, and produces a characteristic stimulant-like pattern of anorexia, hyperactivity and self-administration in animals. This profile is shared with several related drugs such as 6-Br-APB and SKF-82,958, but not with certain other D1 full agonists such as A-77,636, reflecting functional selectivity of D1 activation. Newer findings reveal that SKF-81,297 additionally acts as a partial agonist at D1-D2 receptor heteromers.

One of the patented uses for SKF-81,297 is as an augmentation agent when combined with an appropriate choice of an antidepressant.

References 

1-Phenyl-2,3,4,5-tetrahydro-1H-3-benzazepines
Phenols
D1-receptor agonists
D5 receptor agonists
Chloroarenes